Cetorhinidae is a family of filter feeding mackerel sharks, whose members are commonly known as basking sharks. It includes the extant basking shark, Cetorhinus, as well as two extinct genera, Caucasochasma and Keasius.

References

Cetorhinidae
Shark families
Taxa named by Theodore Gill